Marloes Mere is a Site of Special Scientific Interest (or SSSI) in Pembrokeshire, South Wales. It has been designated as a Site of Special Scientific Interest since November 1985 in an attempt to protect its fragile biological elements.

Type
This site is notable for its wet acidic vegetation. It lies in a hollow on the Marloes peninsula lined with glacial silt and clay and each winter the pasture floods. Such pasture is rare in West Wales. Scarce plants occur and the shallow winter waters and ponds are frequented by waterfowl.
The mere was common land until 1811; at that time Richard Fenton mentioned that it abounded in medicinal leeches (Hirudo medicinalis), from which the villagers derived a considerable trade.

Rare species
Rare plants include:
 three-lobed crowfoot (Ranunculus tripartitus) 
 tubular water-dropwort (Oenanthe fistulosa) growing on the margins of the ditches, reservoirs and pools
 wintering wildfowl include wigeon, shoveler, pintail, teal and mallard
 the great green bush-cricket (Tettigonia viridissima), and the marsh fritillary butterfly (Euphydryas aurinia) 
 six dragonflies including the emperor dragonfly (Anax imperator).

See also
List of Sites of Special Scientific Interest in Pembrokeshire

References

External links
Natural Resources Wales website

Sites of Special Scientific Interest in Pembrokeshire